Sciapus is a genus of long-legged flies in the family Dolichopodidae. There are about 82 described species in Sciapus.

Gallery

See also
 List of Sciapus species

References

Europe
Nearctic

Dolichopodidae genera
Sciapodinae
Taxa named by Philipp Christoph Zeller